David Norman Dumville (born 5 May 1949) is a British medievalist and Celtic scholar. He attended at Emmanuel College, Cambridge, where he studied Anglo-Saxon, Norse and Celtic; Ludwig-Maximilians-Universität München; and received his PhD at the University of Edinburgh in 1976, presenting the thesis "The textual history of the Welsh-Latin Historia Brittonum". He is professor emeritus of Celtic & Anglo-Saxon at the University of Aberdeen. He has previously taught or held posts at Swansea University (Fellow, 1975–1977), the University of Pennsylvania (assistant professor of English, 1977–1978), the University of Cambridge, (lecturer in Anglo-Saxon, Norse and Celtic, 1977–1991; reader in early Mediaeval history and culture of British Isles, 1991–1995; professor of palaeography and cultural history, 1995–2005). Among other academic appointments, he was visiting professor at the University of California, Los Angeles (1995).

Publications
Dumville has produced numerous scholarly articles and books. In 2007, he established a scholarly journal for Anglo-Saxon studies, entitled Anglo-Saxon, which ceased after one issue. He was a founding member of the Medieval Chronicle Society.

References 

1949 births
Alumni of Emmanuel College, Cambridge
British historians
Linguists from the United Kingdom
Celtic studies scholars
Alumni of the University of Edinburgh
Academics of the University of Aberdeen
Academics of Swansea University
Fellows of Girton College, Cambridge
Living people
Anglo-Saxon studies scholars
Historians of the British Isles